The sixty-third Connecticut House of Representatives district elects one member of the Connecticut House of Representatives. Its current representative is Jay Case. The district includes the towns of Colebrook and  Winchester, along with parts of Goshen and Torrington.

List of representatives

Recent elections

External links 
 Google Maps - Connecticut House Districts

References

63